Lorong Chuan is a subzone and a precinct located in the town of Serangoon in the North-East Region of Singapore.

The road which the precinct is named after, links the Central Expressway to Serangoon Garden Way in Serangoon Gardens. It is in the north-eastern region of Singapore. The area around the street is named after this road. There are both public and private housing flanking the street.

It is now served by the Lorong Chuan MRT station on the Circle MRT line. Several bus routes plies through Lorong Chuan vicinity - these include 45, 58, 73, 105, 159, 534 and 568 of which it passes through Lorong Chuan.

History and Etymology
Construction on the road started in 1963 and first opened sometime in 1964–65. The area used to contain farmland and kampungs. "Lorong" is the Malay word for a lane or alley, while "Chuan" means "Fountain" in Hokkien, an auspicious name referring to wealth and prosperity.

Amenities and Landmarks

Lorong Chuan Bridge 
The iconic Lorong Chuan Bridge is one of the oldest pedestrian bridges in Singapore. Built in 1975, it connects the estates along Li Hwan Drive across Ang Mo Kio Avenue 1 to Lorong Chuan estate. The bridge design resembles a long container box with rows of hexagonal windows at both sides.

Other Landmarks 
 Chomp Chomp Food Centre
 New Tech Park
 NTP+ Mall, the new and smallest shopping mall at New Tech Park being opened in April 2021.

Educational Institutions 
 Nanyang Junior College
 Yangzheng Primary School
 Zhonghua Secondary School
 Australian International School Singapore

References

External links
 http://www.transitlink.com.sg

Places in Singapore
Roads in Singapore